María de Toledo or María Álvarez de Toledo (1490 – 11 May 1549) was a Spanish noblewoman and Vicereine and regent of the Spanish Colony of Santo Domingo on Hispaniola, present day Dominican Republic. She was the most powerful and highest-ranking noble in America in the 16th century and a defender of the liberties of the indigenous people in the Hispaniola.

Life
Maria de Toledo was granddaughter of García Álvarez de Toledo, 1st Duke of Alba and niece of Fadrique Álvarez de Toledo, 2nd Duke of Alba, cousin of King Ferdinand II of Aragon "The Catholic".

She was married to Diego Columbus, the son of Christopher Columbus. Her spouse was viceroy of the Spanish colony of Hispaniola. They resided in Alcazar de Colon in Santo Domingo.

During the absence of her spouse from 1514 until 1520, she was left in charge of the colony along with Jerónimo de Agüero. In 1523, when Diego was recalled a second time, she was named virreina. She was then expecting their eighth child.

Issue
 María Colón de Toledo (c. 1510 –), married to Sancho Folch de Cardona, 1st Marquess of Guadalest 
 Luis Colón, 1st Duke of Veragua
 Cristóbal Colón de Toledo (c. 1510 – 1571), married firstly to María Leonor Lerma de Zuazo, without issue; married secondly to Ana de Pravia, and had one son (Diego Colon y Pravia [c. 1551 - Jan 27, 1578]) and one daughter (Francisca Colon y Pravia, [c. 1552 - April 1616]; and married thirdly to María Magadalena de Guzmán y Anaya, and had:
 Diego Colón de Toledo, father of Diego the 4th Admiral of the Indies.
 Francisca Colón de Toledo y Pravia (c. 1550 – April, 1616), married Diego de Ortegón (c. 1550 –), and had four children: Guiomar de Ortegon y Colon [d. 1621]; Jacoba de Oretgon y Colon [d. 1618]; Ana de Ortegon y Colon; and Josefa de Ortegon y Colon
 María Colón de Toledo y Guzmán (c. 1550 –), married to Luis de Avila, and had:
 Cristóbal de Avila y Colón (1579 –), unmarried and without issue
 Luis de Avila y Colón (1582-1633), married Maria de Rojas-Guzman Grajeda, without issue; married secondly to Francisca de Sandoval and had one son Cristobal
 Juan Colón Dávila (-1622)
Bernardino Dávila y Colón (-1633)
 Maria de Avila y Colón (1592-), married Alonso de Guzman Grajeda and had one daughter (Mayor de Grajeda y Avila  [c.1611-]
 Juana Colón de Toledo (died c. 1592), married her cousin Luis de La Cueva y Toledo; their only child was María Colón de la Cueva (c. 1548-c.1600) who claimed the duchy of Veragua and died in New Spain (México).
 Isabel Colón de Toledo (c. 1515 –), married Dom Jorge Alberto de Portugal y Melo (1470 –), 1st Count of Gelves (who married secondly; his 1st marriage to Dona Guiomar de Ataíde remained childless), son of Dom Álvaro de Bragança, Lord of Tentúgal, Póvoa, Buarcos and Cadaval and Chancellor-Major of the Realm of Portugal. Their grandson, D. Nuno Alvares Pereira Colón y Portugal, Duke of Veragua and Admiral of the Indies became regent of the Kingdom of Portugal from 1621 until his death.

References

 Arranz Márquez, Luis (2006). Cristóbal Colón: misterio y grandeza. Madrid: Marcial Pons, Serie Memorias y biografías. .
 Maura, Juan Francisco (2000). «María de Toledo: perfil biográfico de la primera virreina de las Américas». Cuadernos Hispanoamericanos, Instituto de Cooperación Iberoamericana (Madrid) (601-602). OCLC 819862735.
 Maura, Juan Francisco; Maura, Hernando (2005). Españolas de ultramar en la historia y en la literatura. Valencia: Universitat de València, Colección Parnaseo, 1. .
 Vega, Carlos B. (2003). Conquistadoras: mujeres heroicas de la conquista de América. Jefferson, NC (EEUU): McFarland & Co.. .

1490 births
1549 deaths
16th-century Dominican Republic people
Dominican Republic people of Spanish descent
16th-century women rulers